DiscO-Zone is the third and final album by the Moldovan band O-Zone. It was first released on June 6, 2004, in multiple countries throughout Europe. Produced by the band, the album features their hit singles "Dragostea Din Tei (Words of Love)" and "Despre Tine (About You)". It was a commercial success in many European countries, particularly in Portugal where it hit number one for eight consecutive weeks and was in the top 30 for 26 weeks, and it also reached the top ten in Wallonia, Belgium, Poland, Norway, Switzerland, and Finland. In France, it only reached number 15 but stayed in the top 200 for 36 weeks. In Japan it reached the number one position in its 24th week on the chart.

Track listing

Romanian version

Japanese version

Members
Dan Bălan – vocals
Arsenie Todiras –  vocals
Radu Sîrbu – vocals

Charts

Weekly charts

Year-end charts

Certifications

Release history

References

2004 albums
O-Zone albums